Lukian Vasilievich Popov (Russian: Лукиан Васильевич Попов; 20 October 1873, Arkhangelovka, Orenburg Governorate - 20 May 1914, Orenburg) was a genre painter in the Realistic style; associated with the Peredvizhniki. He was from the Russian Empire.

Biography 
He was born to a poor peasant family.

His first artistic studies were at the Drawing School of the Imperial Society for the Encouragement of the Arts. From 1896 to 1902, he studied at the Imperial Academy of Arts with Vladimir Makovsky. Upon graduating, he qualified for a stipend that enabled him to visit Germany and France.

After his return, he went back to Orenburg, where he remained until his death, although he travelled throughout the region, sketching village life. In 1903, he became a member of the Peredvizhniki. In 1912, on the recommendation of Ilya Repin, the Academy awarded him the title of "Academician".

After the Revolution of 1905, many of his paintings were given innocuous names by the censors. "Agitator in the Village" became "By Sunset", for example. Then, in 1914, the governing board of the Peredvizhniki would not allow him to participate because his painting, "The Dying Child", was not in the spirit of the "celebratory tone" of the exhibition. The painting was based on Popov's own son, who had been born blind and died after an operation that might have restored his sight. He was later offered a place to exhibit separately.

Popov died shortly after these events, but none of the available sources indicate that his death was by anything other than natural causes.

Selected paintings

References

Further reading
 Tatiana Orlova, Лукиан Попов (1873-1914) : живопись, графика, Orenburg Regional Museum of Fine Arts, 2009 .
 Frida Roginskaya, Лукиан Васильевич Попов, 1873-1914, Artists of the RFSFR, 1961

External links 

 "He Carried Tragedy in His Soul", reflections on Popov's life by Tatiana Sudorgina @ Вечерний Оренбург

1873 births
1914 deaths
People from Orenburgsky Uyezd
Peredvizhniki
Painters from the Russian Empire